Handan Agha Mosque is a mosque near the Golden Horn in the Hasköy neighborhood of Beyoğlu, Istanbul, Turkey. It is also known as the Kuşkonmaz or "Birds Don't Perch" Mosque. One of Sultan Mehmed II's aghas, Handan Agha, had it built in the 15th century. The interior is decorated with İznik tiles from the 16th and 17th centuries, with some maiolica tiles from the 19th century. The basement of the mosque was formerly a boathouse, until the coastline was filled for land reclamation. The mosque was repaired in the 18th and 19th centuries, and the 1960s.

References
 Ani Anıtsal Yapılar Koruma Değerlendirme ve Yapım Mimarlık Restorasyon Ltd. Şti.İstanbul: Handan Ağa Camii Rölöve Restitüsyon ve Restorasyon Projeleri. URL: https://web.archive.org/web/20110707144041/http://www.anitsal.com/projedetay.asp?pid=254 Retrieved 9 October 2009. 

Ottoman mosques in Istanbul
Golden Horn
Beyoğlu
15th-century mosques